Systematic Automation, Inc. is the world's largest manufacturer of precision screen printing machines, vacuum tables, rotary indexer base machines, and UV curing devices.  The company, located in Farmington, CT, specializes in standard and custom solutions for a variety of screen printing applications. Though originally a manufacturer of screen printing machines, the company has expanded its operations to include vacuum tables and UV curing devices.

History

Systematic Automation, Inc. was founded in 1983 in Chicago, Illinois. The company moved to a larger facility in Connecticut to accommodate a doubling of capacity in 1987. Systematic Automation invented a rotary indexing table in 1988, introducing the technology to screen printing applications. That same year, the company entered the UV curing industry with the introduction of the UVSP Curing Unit. To meet the complex requirements of multicolor screen printed designs, a new line of machines was designed and manufactured in 2001 that consisted of a conveying system for multiple vacuum tables moved successively through screen printing and UV curing work stations. More recently, engineers at the company have developed machines for automatically printing insulated foam can coolers, known as koozies, as well as a fully automatic screen printer for microscope slides or other flat glass.  Other notable accomplishments include building a screen printing machine capable of depositing 0.002" lines of platinum 0.002" apart for hydrogen battery wafers used on the Space Shuttle.

References

Companies established in 1983
Companies based in Hartford County, Connecticut
Printing companies of the United States